Raymond Flood may refer to:
Raymond Flood (mathematician), British mathematician at University of Oxford and Gresham College
Raymond Flood (cricketer) (1935–2014), English cricketer